The Notorious Mrs. Sands is a lost 1920 American silent drama film directed by Christy Cabanne and produced by and  starring Bessie Barriscale.

Plot
As described in a film magazine, Mary Ware (Barriscale) and Ronald Cliffe (Stanley) become engaged. While planning their wedding, Mary discovers that her mother is indebted to Grey Sands (Myers), who desires her hand in marriage.

Feeling that her duty is to her mother, although despising Grey, Mary breaks her engagement and consents to wed the capitalist with the understanding that affection will not enter into the marriage contract. Being a loveless marriage, she is constantly ill-treated with mean tricks by her husband, who vows that he will make her love him, although he has intimate relations with another woman. He succeeds in partially compromising her with her former sweetheart, and Mary becomes known as the notorious Mrs. Sands.

After succeeding in this depraved scheme, he divorces her, and Mary returns to the man she originally loved.

Cast
Bessie Barriscale as Mary Ware
Forrest Stanley as Ronald Cliffe
Dorothy Cumming as Dulcie Charteris
Harry Myers as Grey Sands (credited as Harry Meyers)
Ben Alexander as Child

References

External links

1920 films
American silent feature films
Lost American films
Films directed by Christy Cabanne
American black-and-white films
Silent American drama films
1920 drama films
Film Booking Offices of America films
1920 lost films
Lost drama films
1920s American films